Sesame is a flowering plant used as a seed crop.

Sesame or SESAME may also refer to:

Science and technology
 Sesame (framework), a Resource Description Framework (RDF) tool
 Sesame, various wild and cultivated plants in the genus Sesamum
 EAST syndrome, also called SeSAME syndrome, a syndrome of seizures, ataxia, and other signs
 Surface Electric Sounding and Acoustic Monitoring Experiments, a suite of experiments performed by the Philae comet lander
 Synchrotron-Light for Experimental Science and Applications in the Middle East, an international research facility in Jordan

Arts, entertainment, and media
 Sesame (magazine), a magazine for students and alumni of the Open University
 Sesame Street, a children's TV show

See also
 Open Sesame (disambiguation)
 Sesam (disambiguation)